Fireproof Australia is an Australian climate change activism group.

Members of the group were arrested after blocking the Sydney Harbour Bridge in 2022. One member was briefly jailed on remand, before successful appealing the conviction.

Organisation history 
Fireproof Australia is an Australia climate change activism group that was founded in 2022 in Sydney, Australia. Founding members included Violet Coco. The group has stated that it was formed in response to the lack of response by the Australian government to the 2019–20 Australian bushfire season that left 18,000 Australians internally displaced. The group rose to prominence in 2022 for a series of protests, including blocking high streets, interrupting a National Rugby League game, and obstructing traffic on the Sydney Harbour bridgefor which Violet Coco was sentenced to 15 months in prison.

In mid March 2023, a judge quashed the jail sentence and convictions for two other Fireproof Australia activists after finding that New South Wales Police Force had submitted false evidence at the earlier trial. Evidence of the protest blocking the route of an emergency ambulance was withdrawn by the police.

Membership 
Members include Violet Coco, Rural Fire Service member Alan Russell Glover, and Karen Fitz-Gibbon.

References

External links 

 Fireproof Australia - official website

2022 establishments in Australia
Climate change organisations based in Australia
Organizations established in 2022
Organisations based in Sydney
Climate change in Australia